The Eric and Margaret Ann (Davis) Brown House is a single-family home located at 2806 Taliesin Drive in Kalamazoo, Michigan. It was listed on the National Register of Historic Places in 2016. It is perhaps one of the best preserved Usonian houses designed by Frank Lloyd Wright.

History
Eric Brown was born in Royal Oak, Michigan, in 1914, graduated from Wayne State University, and received a law degree from the University of Michigan in 1937. He married Margaret Ann Davis in 1939. She was born in Plainwell, Michigan in 1913, and. She  graduated from Carleton College in 1935. The couple lived in Grand Rapids for a few years, then moved to Kalamazoo in 1941. After a few years, Eric Brown started his own law firm. In 1946, the Browns and five other families established the Parkwyn Village Association, with the intention of constructing a "congenial housing community" where they could raise their families. The association contacted Frank Lloyd Wright about designing homes for the planned community.

Construction began on the Brown's home in 1950, and the family moved in during in 1951. The couple lived in the house until 2002, when health issued forced them to move, Eric Brown died later that year, and Margaret followed in 2006. In 2002, the Browns sold the home to Kathryn and Curtis Curtis-Smith. Peter and Janet Copeland purchased the Brown House in 2012.

Description
The Brown House is a single-story, rectangular Usonian house with a slightly pitched, cantilevered roof. The house measures 130 feet long and 18 to 32 feet wide, containing approximately 2,684 square feet of living space. It is set well back from the street on a mostly wooded, one acre lot. The house is constructed concrete blocks. The house is set into a sloping hillside, so that the house has a very low appearance from the street (the uphill side).  The low, street-facing facade contains a row of clerestory windows running the length of the house which sit only about twelve inches off the ground. The opposite facade overlooks Lorenz Lake, and contains large windows and doors along most of its length. A walled patio also runs along the facade.

References

		
National Register of Historic Places in Kalamazoo County, Michigan
Modernist architecture in Michigan
Houses completed in 1951
Frank Lloyd Wright buildings
1951 establishments in Michigan
Buildings and structures in Kalamazoo, Michigan